Michael Ostrowski (born 3 January 1973) is an Austrian actor, screenwriter, and presenter. He has appeared in more than forty films since 2002.

Selected filmography

References

External links 

1973 births
Living people
Austrian male film actors